Bebearia leptotypa is a butterfly in the family Nymphalidae. It is found in the Democratic Republic of the Congo (Uele, north Kivu, Equateur, Kinshasa and Sankuru).

References

Butterflies described in 1908
leptotypa
Endemic fauna of the Democratic Republic of the Congo
Butterflies of Africa